The Downham and Stoke Ferry Railway was a branch line in western Norfolk, England.

History
It was authorised on 24 July 1879, and opened on 1 August 1882, being worked by the Great Eastern Railway (GER). There were two intermediate stations:  and Abbey (latterly known as Abbey and West Dereham).

Ownership changes
On 6 August 1897 an Act of Parliament authorised the GER to absorb the D&SF, which they did on 1 January 1898. Being part of the GER, the line passed to the London and North Eastern Railway (LNER) at the Grouping on 1 January 1923.

When the railways were nationalised in 1948 operation of the line became the responsibility of British Railways Eastern Region.

Closure
The LNER withdrew the passenger service on 22 September 1930.

Freight services were withdrawn from Denver (13 July 1964) Ryston (28 December 1964) Abbey (31 January 1966) and Stoke Ferry (19 July 1965).

The section between Abbey and Stoke Ferry was abandoned in 1965 but traffic continued to the Wissington Railway until 1982.

Wissington Light Railway
At , a privately owned line, the Wissington Light Railway, branched off. It opened , mostly closed in 1957, and finally closed in 1982.

Notes

References

Rail transport in Norfolk
Closed railway lines in the East of England
Railway companies established in 1879
Railway lines opened in 1882
Railway companies disestablished in 1898
British companies established in 1879